Richard Linton, ASMA, (born 1935) is an internationally renowned Australian artist. His paintings are primarily of maritime subjects.

Early life
Linton was born in Melbourne in 1935. From the age of 16, he apprenticed in the printing trade, and also trained in photolithography at the Melbourne School of Printing (now a part of RMIT). He is primarily self-taught in painting. His first professional work was in 1957.

Works
Linton is one of a select number of artists to have their work reproduced by the Franklin Mint and Mourlot Studios. His paintings have won numerous awards worldwide. He has twice won the prestigious Heidelberg Award. His work is represented in many public and private collections worldwide.

His studio was first located in central Frankston, a bayside suburb of Melbourne. In 2005, he relocated his studio to the Morning Star Estate, a vineyard just outside Frankston. His studio is housed in the old dairy on the estate.

His most recent works include The River Min and Spirit of the High Country.

References

Texts
Germaine, Max. Artists and Galleries of Australia, Volumes 1 & 2, Third Edition. Craftsman Press, Sydney, 1990. Page 410

External links
Richard Linton Maritime Art (official)
Showcase Art, Ltd. – Richard Linton

Australian painters
Australian printmakers
RMIT University alumni
Living people
1935 births
Artists from Melbourne